Henry Scott-Stokes (15 June 1938 – 19 April 2022) was a British journalist who was the Tokyo bureau chief for The Financial Times (1964–67), The Times (1967-1970s?), and The New York Times (1978–83).

He was educated at Winchester College and New College, Oxford. After graduating, he moved to Japan, where he became a journalist of the Tokyo bureau of The Times. Also around this time, he became close friends with famous Japanese author Yukio Mishima.

He was a denier of the Nanjing Massacre.  

He was the father of Henry Sugiyama Adrian Folliott Scott-Stokes. He suffered from advanced Parkinson's disease.

Bibliography

References

1938 births
2022 deaths
People from Glastonbury
People educated at Winchester College
Alumni of New College, Oxford
British male journalists
The Times people
The New York Times writers
British biographers
British expatriates in Japan
Yukio Mishima
Nanjing Massacre deniers
20th-century biographers
British male dramatists and playwrights
20th-century British journalists
20th-century British male writers
20th-century British dramatists and playwrights
Male biographers